KSEL may refer to:

 KSEL (AM), a radio station (1450 AM) licensed to Portales, New Mexico, United States
 KSEL-FM, a radio station (105.9 FM) licensed to Portales, New Mexico, United States